In mathematics and economics, the envelope theorem is a major result about the differentiability properties of the value function of a parameterized optimization problem. As we change parameters of the objective, the envelope theorem shows that, in a certain sense, changes in the optimizer of the objective do not contribute to the change in the objective function. The envelope theorem is an important tool for comparative statics of optimization models.

The term envelope derives from describing the graph of the value function as the "upper envelope" of the graphs of the parameterized family of functions   that are optimized.

Statement
The Lagrangian expression of this problem is given by

where  are the Lagrange multipliers. Now let  and  together be the solution that maximizes the objective function f subject to the constraints (and hence are saddle points of the Lagrangian),

and define the value function

Then we have the following theorem.

Then

where .

For arbitrary choice sets
Let  denote the choice set and let the relevant parameter be . Letting  denote the parameterized objective function, the value function  and the optimal choice correspondence (set-valued function)  are given by:

"Envelope theorems" describe sufficient conditions for the value function  to be differentiable in the parameter  and describe its derivative as

Namely, the derivative of the value function with respect to the parameter equals the partial derivative of the objective function with respect to  holding the maximizer fixed at its optimal level. 

(The argument is that changes in the maximizer have only a "second-order effect" at the optimum and so can be ignored.) However, in many applications such as the analysis of incentive constraints in contract theory and game theory, nonconvex production problems, and "monotone" or "robust" comparative statics, the choice sets and objective functions generally lack the topological and convexity properties required by the traditional envelope theorems.

Paul Milgrom and Segal (2002) observe that the traditional envelope formula holds for optimization problems with arbitrary choice sets at any differentiability point of the value function, provided that the objective function is differentiable in the parameter:

If both  and  exist, the envelope formula holds.

Q.E.D.

While differentiability of the value function in general requires strong assumptions, in many applications weaker conditions such as absolute continuity, differentiability almost everywhere, or left- and right-differentiability, suffice.

Theorem 2: Suppose that  is absolutely continuous for all . Suppose also that there exists an integrable function    such that  for all  and almost all . Then  is absolutely continuous. Then for any selection ,

This implies that  is absolutely continuous. Therefore,  is differentiable almost everywhere, and using  yields. Q.E.D.

This result dispels the common misconception that nice behavior of the value function requires correspondingly nice behavior of the maximizer. Theorem 2 ensures the absolute continuity of the value function even though the maximizer may be discontinuous.

Applications

Applications to producer theory
Theorem 1 implies Hotelling's lemma at any differentiability point of the profit function, and Theorem 2 implies the producer surplus formula. Formally, let  denote the indirect profit function of a price-taking firm with production set  facing prices , and let  denote the firm's supply function, i.e.,

Applying Theorem 1 to  yields  (the firm's optimal supply of good ). Applying Theorem 2 (whose assumptions are verified when  is restricted to a bounded interval) yields

i.e. the producer surplus  can be obtained by integrating under the firm's supply curve for good .

Applications to mechanism design and auction theory
Consider an agent whose utility function  over outcomes  depends on his type . Let  represent the "menu" of possible outcomes the agent could obtain in the mechanism by sending different messages. The agent's equilibrium utility  in the mechanism is then given by (1), and the set  of the mechanism's equilibrium outcomes is given by (2). Any selection  is a choice rule implemented by the mechanism. Then Theorem 2 implies that the agent's equilibrium utility  in any mechanism implementing a given choice rule  must satisfy the integral condition (4).

The integral condition (4) is a key step in the analysis of mechanism design problems with continuous type spaces. In this case, letting  denote the bidder's lowest possible type, the integral condition (4) for the bidder's equilibrium expected utility  takes the form

(This equation can be interpreted as the producer surplus formula for the firm whose production technology for converting numeraire  into probability  of winning the object is defined by the auction and which resells the object at a fixed price ). This condition in turn yields Myerson's (1981) celebrated revenue equivalence theorem: the expected revenue generated in an auction in which bidders have independent private values is fully determined by the bidders' probabilities  of getting the object for all types  as well as by the expected payoffs  of the bidders' lowest types. Finally, this condition is a key step in Myerson's (1981) of optimal auctions.

For other applications of the envelope theorem to mechanism design see Mirrlees (1971), Holmstrom (1979), Laffont and Maskin (1980), Riley and Samuelson (1981), Fudenberg and Tirole (1991), and Williams (1999). While these authors derived and exploited the envelope theorem by restricting attention to (piecewise) continuously differentiable choice rules or even narrower classes, it may sometimes be optimal to implement a choice rule that is not piecewise continuously differentiable. (One example is the class of trading problems with linear utility described in chapter 6.5 of Myerson (1991).) Note that the integral condition (3) still holds in this setting and implies such important results as Holmstrom's lemma (Holmstrom, 1979), Myerson's lemma (Myerson, 1981), the revenue equivalence theorem (for auctions), the Green–Laffont–Holmstrom theorem (Green and Laffont, 1979; Holmstrom, 1979), the Myerson–Satterthwaite inefficiency theorem (Myerson and Satterthwaite, 1983), the Jehiel–Moldovanu impossibility theorems (Jehiel and Moldovanu, 2001), the McAfee–McMillan weak-cartels theorem (McAfee and McMillan, 1992), and Weber's martingale theorem (Weber, 1983), etc. The details of these applications are provided in Chapter 3 of Milgrom (2004), who offers an elegant and unifying framework in auction and mechanism design analysis mainly based on the envelope theorem and other familiar techniques and concepts in demand theory.

Applications to multidimensional parameter spaces
For a multidimensional parameter space , Theorem
1 can be applied to partial and directional derivatives of the value
function. Theorem 2 implies that for any such smooth path, the change of the value function can be expressed as the path integral of the partial gradient  of the objective function along the path:

This "integrability condition" plays an important role in mechanism design with multidimensional types, constraining what kind of choice rules  can be sustained by mechanism-induced menus . In application to producer theory, with  being the firm's production vector and  being the price vector, and the integrability condition says that any rationalizable supply function  must satisfy

When  is continuously differentiable, this integrability condition is equivalent to the symmetry of the substitution matrix . (In consumer theory, the same argument applied to the expenditure minimization problem yields symmetry of the Slutsky matrix.)

Applications to parameterized constraints
Suppose now that the feasible set  depends on the parameter, i.e.,

where  for some 

Under these assumptions, it is well known that the above constrained optimization program can be represented as a saddle-point problem for the Lagrangian , where  is the vector of Lagrange multipliers chosen by the adversary to minimize the Lagrangian. In particular, letting  denote the Lagrangian's saddle point for parameter value , the theorem implies that  is absolutely continuous and satisfies

That is, the Lagrange multiplier  on the constraint is its "shadow price" in the optimization program.

Other applications
Milgrom and Segal (2002) demonstrate that the generalized version of the envelope theorems can also be applied to convex programming, continuous optimization problems, saddle-point problems, and optimal stopping problems.

See also

 Maximum theorem
 Danskin's theorem
 Hotelling's lemma
 Le Chatelier's principle
 Roy's identity
 Value function

References

Production economics
Calculus of variations
Economics theorems
Theorems in analysis